Kevin James Shine (born 22 February 1969) is a former first-class cricketer and former coach of Somerset County Cricket Club, and was the fast-bowling coach for the England cricket team from 2006 until 2019. In November 2019 he joined Nottinghamshire County Cricket Club as an Assistant Coach.

His first-class career ran from 1989 to 1998, during which he played for Hampshire, Middlesex and Somerset. He took 249 first-class wickets at an average of 36.09, including 55 in the 1997 season. His best innings figures were 8 for 47 for Hampshire against Lancashire in 1992.

Coaching career
After retiring as a player due to injury, he served as coach of Somerset from 2001 to 2004. The team won the C&G Trophy in his first year in charge. He subsequently served as the director of the Somerset academy, and was appointed England's fast-bowling coach from March 2006 in succession to Troy Cooley. In 2019 he left the ECB and became assistant head coach at Nottinghamshire County Cricket Club.

Notes

References 
 
 Kevin Shine at CricketArchive
 Shine appointed as England bowling coach from Cricinfo
 Shine gets England coaching role from BBC News Online

English cricketers
Hampshire cricketers
Middlesex cricketers
Somerset cricketers
English cricket coaches
1969 births
Living people
Berkshire cricketers